Valeria Pirone (born 3 December 1998) is an Italian professional footballer who plays as a forward for Serie A club Parma and the Italy women's national team.

International career
Pirone made her debut for the Italy national team on 26 October 2011 against Russia, coming on as a substitute in place of Daniela Sabatino.

References

1998 births
Living people
Women's association football forwards
Italian women's footballers
Italy women's international footballers
People from Torre del Greco
S.S.D. Napoli Femminile players
A.S.D. AGSM Verona F.C. players
A.S. Roma (women) players
Parma Calcio 2022 players
Serie A (women's football) players
U.S. Sassuolo Calcio (women) players
Footballers from Campania
Res Roma players
Atalanta Mozzanica Calcio Femminile Dilettantistico players
Hellas Verona Women players